Chandra Bahadur Dangi (30 November 1939 – 3 September 2015) (or ) was a Nepali man who was the shortest man in recorded history measuring . Dangi was a primordial dwarf.

Dangi came to the attention of the media when a wood contractor saw him in his village in the Dang district of Nepal. He was awarded the title of shortest adult human ever recorded after his height was measured in February 2012. He was subsequently included in the Guinness World Records. Three of his five brothers were less than 1.22 m (four feet) tall, while his two sisters and two other brothers are of average height.

Biography
Dangi was born on 30 November 1939. It is unknown what medical condition limited his growth. Before being recognised by the Guinness World Records as the world's shortest man in 2012, he had never left his home village. After being awarded the title, he said he had always wished to travel to all parts of his country and the world. He stated that being the shortest man in the world and a citizen of Nepal, he wanted to use his status to popularise his country.

In 2012, at the age of 72, Dangi met the world's shortest woman, Jyoti Amge of Nagpur, India. The pair posed together for the 57th edition of The Guinness Book of Records in 2013. On 13 November 2014, as part of Guinness World Records Day, Dangi met the world's tallest living man, Sultan Kösen, at an event in London.

Dangi died in American Samoa on 3 September 2015 at the age of 75, at the Lyndon B. Johnson Tropical Medical Center in Pago Pago. His exact cause of death was not disclosed, although The Kathmandu Post reported that he had previously been suffering from pneumonia. He had been touring the South Pacific for much of the year with Samoa's Tupa'l Bruno's Magic Circus.

See also 
 List of people with dwarfism
 Dwarfism
 List of the verified shortest people

References

External links

 Nepalese man named shortest ever in history
 Shortest Man of the World Chandra Bahadur Dangi 

1939 births
2015 deaths
People from Salyan District, Nepal
People with dwarfism
Nepalese people with disabilities
World record holders
Burials in Nepal